Wenonah High School is a four-year public high school in Birmingham, Alabama. It is one of seven high schools in the Birmingham City School System. School colors are Old gold and white. The mascot is the Dragon. Wenonah competes in Alabama High School Athletic Association (AHSAA) Class 5A athletics.

Student Profile 
Enrollment in grades 9-12 for the 2013-14 school year is 782 students. Over 99% of students are African-American and roughly 85% of students qualify for free or reduced price lunch.

Wenonah has a graduation rate of 53%. Approximately 82% of its students meet or exceed proficiency standards in mathematics, and 77% meet or exceed standards in reading. The average ACT score for Wenonah students is 20.

History 
Construction began in late 1946, and in the fall of 1947, students in grades 8-12 from Riley Elementary School and Galilee, Mt. Olive and Bryant Chapel AME Churches began classes in Wenonah Elementary School's first floor while construction on the second floor and high school was being completed.

The high school was built at a cost of $500,000 and included 15 classrooms, administrative office, lunchroom, athletic room, shoe repair, upholstery and radio repair shop, cosmetology, foods and clothing labs. It was opened in January 1948 with an enrollment of 415 students. Its first graduating class participated in commencement in May.

In 1956, seven classrooms, a library and gym were added to the school plant, and in 1968, a vocational program was started. In the spring of 1970, a new $300,000 facility was erected by the Jefferson County Board of Education to house the Wenonah Area Vocational School. The building was located on the southwest side of the Wenonah High School campus.

In 1973, Wenonah grew to a record enrollment of 1,400 students and in 1974 was annexed into the city of Birmingham. Administration of Wenonah was taken over by the Birmingham Board of Education.

In 1981, a new gym was constructed and equipped at a cost of more than $1 million. By 2000, the Wenonah physical plant had grown to include an elementary school, a state technical school and a junior college.

Construction started on the current Wenonah campus in 2005 and was completed in 2007 at a cost of $41 million. The site of the new school is located northeast of the previous facility.

Campus 
The current Wenonah campus is a  facility that accommodates up to 1,200 students. It includes a 750-seat auditorium with theatrical lighting and sound systems. The main academic building features a media center, computer laboratories, and classrooms.

A career-technical wing contains an electronics classroom and lab, a fully equipped commercial kitchen and a family and consumer science classroom. There are also classrooms and labs for welding and cosmetology. The wing also includes classrooms for the band and choir, as well as the cafeteria.

The school includes a gymnasium for practice and physical education classes. The "new gym" that was part of the old school, a free-standing building, has been renovated and expanded to be a 1,400 seat-competition gym. In 2014, the gym was named the Willie High Basketball Arena in honor of Willie High, Sr.

The school includes a football stadium with a six-lane track, concession stands, restrooms and irrigation system. The stadium, which seats 4,500, was completed in December 2007. In 2012, a Field House Training Facility was opened. In 2014, the stadium was named the Bell-Cullpeper Stadium, in honor of Robert Bell and L. C. Cullpepper.

Athletics 
Wenonah competes in AHSAA Class 5A athletics and fields teams in the following sports:
 Baseball
 Basketball (boys and girls)
 Cheerleading
 Cross Country (boys)
 Football
 Indoor track and field (boys)
 Outdoor track and field (boys and girls)
 Softball
 Volleyball
Wenonah has won state championships in the following sports:
 Boys' basketball (1977, 1990, 1993, 2011, 2012, 2013, 2019)
 Girls' basketball (1949, 1986, 1990, 1993, 2004, 2014, 2015, 2016, 2017)
Wenonah's football team won regional championships in 1985, 1989, 1995, 1997,2015, and State 5A Runner-up in 2016.

Notable alumni

 
 Arthur D. Beard III, PhD (1998), Music Educator, Renowned Musician, Choir Master, National Music Leader

Judge Ralph D Cook (1961), former Alabama Supreme Court Justice
 Alonzo Ephraim (1999), former offensive lineman for the University of Alabama, Philadelphia Eagles, Miami Dolphins, and Cleveland Browns
 Ron Jackson (1971), former MLB player for the California Angels, Minnesota Twins, Detroit Tigers, and Baltimore Orioles
 Lawrence Jackson (1968), former MLB player for the Chicago White Sox
 Ligarius Jennings (1996), former football player for the Cincinnati Bengals
 Lamar Johnson (1968), former MLB player for the Chicago White Sox and Texas Rangers
 Chad Williams (1998), former safety for the Baltimore Ravens and San Francisco 49ers
 John McDaniel (1969), former wide receiver for the Cincinnati Bengals and Washington Redskins
 Sam Shade (1991), former safety for the University of Alabama, Cincinnati Bengals, and Washington Redskins 
 Joe Webb (2005), former quarterback for the University of Alabama - Birmingham and Quarterback for the Carolina Panthers
 Jeremy Towns (2008), former defensive tackle for the Buffalo Bills
 Quinnen Williams (2016), defensive lineman for the New York Jets and University of Alabama; 2018 Outland Trophy Winner
 Quincy Williams (2014), linebacker for the New York Jets, Jacksonville Jaguars, and Murray State
 De'Runnya Wilson (2013), wide receiver for Mississippi State, and Albany Empire

External links
 Wenonah High School website
 Wenonah alumni web site
 Wenonah athletics website
 Wenonah school profile on SchoolDigger
 Wenonah school profile on Niche
 Wenonah High School Sports History

References 

High schools in Birmingham, Alabama
Public high schools in Alabama
Educational institutions established in 1947
School buildings completed in 1948
1947 establishments in Alabama
Schools in Jefferson County, Alabama